USS YP-155 was a converted fishing vessel which served as an auxiliary patrol boat in the U.S. Navy during World War II.

History
She was laid down as seiner and named Storm. In 1941, she was acquired by the U.S. Navy, designated as a Yard Patrol Craft (YP), and assigned to the 13th Naval District. She was one of the initial ships assigned to Ralph C. Parker's Alaskan Sector of the 13th Naval District colloquially known as the "Alaskan Navy". She operated out of Dutch Harbor.

On 3 January 1946, she was struck from the Naval List.

References

Auxiliary ships of the United States Navy
Yard patrol boats of the United States Navy
Ships of the Aleutian Islands campaign